Wellington Boone (born 1948) is an African-American evangelical Christian leader and author. 
He is the founder and chief prelate of the Fellowship of International Churches. He claims to have been a successful church planter for more than 40 years.

History
Wellington Boone was born in 1948. He served in the United States Army in-country in 1968, during the Vietnam War.

Boone was ordained into the ministry in 1973. He began his ministry with Word of Faith seminars and churches he founded in Ettrick and Richmond, Virginia. He later founded New Generation Campus Ministries at the nearby Virginia State University and Virginia Commonwealth University.

In 1983 he incorporated the Living Word Evangelistic Association, and later changed the name to Wellington Boone Ministries. His first church, founded in 1981, was Manna Christian Fellowship of Ettrick, Virginia. The second church was Manna Christian Fellowship of Richmond, Virginia, which was incorporated in 1985. In 1995, Boone transitioned from Richmond to Atlanta, Georgia, where he founded The Father's House Church. He served there as senior pastor until March 2015, when he commissioned Bishop Garland Hunt and his wife Pastor Eileen Hunt to replace him.

Boone wrote two books that were published by Doubleday, Your Wife Is Not Your Momma (1999) and The Low Road to New Heights (2002). Also in 2002, he published the first edition of his Christian self-accountability journal My Journey with God, which has since been revised and expanded in other editions such as Your Journey with God and A Man's Journey with God. In 2009 he published Dare to Hope, a 30-day devotional. This was followed by Holy Ghost Is My Friend in 2011.

In October 2016, Boone was a TV guest on Fox & Friends when he debuted his book Black Self-Genocide: What Black Lives Matter Won't Say. Another TV interview with the author was called "Reversing the Curse of Black Self-Genocide" and was shown on CBN News.

In the 1990s, during a Promise Keepers meeting in Indianapolis that is available on YouTube, he declared before 70,000 mostly White men, "We are one!"

Boone has been a host and guest on the Christian television networks CBN and TBN and has been a platform speaker for Promise Keepers, Focus on the Family, American Association of Christian Counselors and the Family Research Council.  He has also been a member of the board of the Evangelical Council for Financial Accountability and the Board of Trustees at Regent University.

Boone founded the Network of Politically Active Christians (NPAC), which has its headquarters in Washington, DC; Kingmakers, a national ministry of Christian women in leadership where Pastor Eileen Hunt is the current president; The Fellowship of International Churches, Goshen International, which established Learning Centers in South Africa for Black African and Colored children, and Global Outreach Campus Ministries.

Boone was married to his high school sweetheart Katheryn from 1973 until her death on March 12, 2022.

Controversial views
Bishop Boone has said that Black Americans are suffering from "self-genocide", arguing that many more Blacks are killed by other Blacks than by policemen, especially through abortion and inner-city murders.

He has also stated that "I want to boldly affirm Uncle Tom. The black community must stop criticizing Uncle Tom. He is a role model."

Bishop Boone said of African-American slavery in the United States, "I believe that slavery, and the understanding of it when you see it God's way, was redemptive."

He has been critical of comparisons between the Gay Rights Movement and the Civil Rights Movement. He called it the "Rape of the Civil Rights Movement".

Bishop Boone has been a keynote speaker for these and other national and international organizations:
 Anglican Communion, in coordination with Bishop Bill Atwood
 Billy Graham Evangelistic Association
 CRU (Campus Crusade for Christ)
 CBN with Pat Robertson
 TBN, where the late Jan Crouch produced his weekly TV show "Heaven in Your Home" 
 Daystar with Marcus and Joni Lamb
 Family Research Council with Tony Perkins
 Focus on the Family founded by Dr. James Dobson 
 Liberty University with President Jerry Falwell Jr.
 Morningstar Ministries with Rick Joyner, where he has served on the Board for more than 20 years
 NRB (National Religious Broadcasters)
 Regent University (where he served many years on the Board of Trustees under Dr. Pat Robertson and remains active)
 Salvation Army
 World Changers with Dr. Creflo Dollar

Reception 

He was ranked by researcher George Barna and co-author Harry Jackson Jr. as the #1 Black American leader in racial reconciliation of the 20th Century.

Ben Carson described Boone's book Black Self-Genocide: What Black Lives Matter Won't Say as "riveting" and "sage advice for how to empower the black community in America".”

The Southern Poverty Law Center describes him as "a strict Christian "dominionist" who advocates replacing constitutional democracy with Biblical law. He takes literally the language in the Bible that he feels outlaws homosexual behavior."

Publications 
Basic Black Journal
Black Self-Genocide 
Breaking Through: Taking the Kingdom Into the Culture by Out-Serving Others 
Women Are Kingmakers 
Your Wife Is Not Your Momma: How You Can Have Heaven in Your Home
Breaking Through 
Your Journey With God
Low Road to New Heights

References

External links

Wellington Boone Ministries
About Wellington Boone
Goshen International
Global Outreach Campus Ministries
Biography of Boone at the Family Research Council
Wellington Boone Papers at Regent University

Living people
Promise Keepers
Regent University people
African-American-related controversies
1948 births